The EuroBasket 2013 Final was the championship game of EuroBasket 2013. The game was played at the Arena Stožice in Ljubljana, Slovenia on 22 September between France and Lithuania. France won their first ever European title by winning the match 80–66.

Road to the Final

All results

France

France ended in first place in Group A, after it only lost to Germany in its first game. In the Top 16, France finished third in Group E behind Serbia and Lithuania.

In the quarterfinals, France beat Slovenia 72–62. In the semi-finals, the French upset title favorite Spain by winning 72–75 in overtime.

Lithuania

Lithuania ended in third place in Group B, just making it to the second round due to an advantage in a tie-breaker with Bosnia and Herzegovina. In the top 16, the team went 4–1 and finished second.

In the quarterfinals, Lithuania beat Italy 81–77. In the semi-finals, the Lithuanians beat Croatia 62–77.

Match details

References

FIBA EuroBasket 2013
Sport in Ljubljana
2013
Final
2013
2013
September 2013 sports events in Europe